A handspring is an acrobatic move in which a person executes a complete revolution of the body by lunging headfirst from an upright position into an inverted vertical position and then pushing off (i.e., "springing") from the floor with the hands so as to leap back to an upright position. The direction of body rotation in a handspring may be either forward or backward, and either kind may be performed from a stationary standing position or while in motion. Body movement may be terminated upon completion of a handspring, or the performer's momentum may be leveraged so as to immediately perform another handspring or other rotational move.

Handsprings are performed in various physical activities, including acro dance, cheerleading and gymnastics. In competitive activities, handsprings may be judged on a number of criteria.

Description 
A handspring is an acrobatic move in which a person executes a complete revolution of the body by lunging headfirst from an upright position into an inverted vertical position and then pushing off (i.e., "springing") from the floor with the hands so as to leap back to an upright position. Handsprings are performed in various physical activities, including acro dance, cheerleading and gymnastics.

Types 

The direction of body rotation in a handspring may be either forward or backward, resulting in a front handspring or back handspring, respectively. In a back handspring the performer does not see where the hands will land until after the move has begun.

A standing handspring is one that begins from a stationary standing position. For example, a back handspring that begins with the performer in a stationary standing position is a standing back handspring.

Body movement may be terminated upon completion of a handspring, or the performer's momentum may be leveraged so as to immediately perform another handspring or other rotational move (e.g., a flip, such as a tuck or layout). Similarly, another rotational move (e.g., a roundoff) may precede a handspring in order to develop sufficient momentum for the handspring.

In gymnastics 

In artistic gymnastics, handsprings are commonly performed in the floor exercise, vault, and balance beam events.

Technique 
A standing back handspring begins with a three phase sequence known as "up, sit, jump". In the up phase, the gymnast stands up straight on flat feet, with arms in front at an angle slightly above horizontal. In the sit phase, the gymnast swings the arms down by the sides of the torso, bends knees, and sits back as if sitting in a chair; while in this position, the gymnast is unbalanced. Together, the sit and jump phases impart angular momentum to the body, causing it to rotate. In the jump phase, the gymnast swings both arms up by the ears and jumps into the air while transitioning to an arch position, with the head in a neutral position, arms and legs straight, and feet together; this body shape is maintained until the hands contact the floor. With hands on the floor, the body's angular momentum is used to transform the gymnast's body shape from an arch, through a linear shape, to a "hollow" shape. The hands are then pushed against the floor, causing the body to lift off from the floor while the body continues its feet-first rotation. Finally, the feet land on the floor, behind the body's center of gravity, and the remaining angular momentum is depleted as it carries the gymnast to a stationary standing position.

Judging 
Gymnastics judges will deduct points if certain criteria are not satisfied during a handspring. For example, in a standing back handspring the judges will evaluate aspects of form and motion such as:
 Begin standing up straight, on flat feet with arms in front at an angle slightly above horizontal.
 Upon jumping, head held in a neutral position, arms and legs straight, and feet together.
 Upon landing, no additional steps (to correct balance), arms raised high ("salute").

In a front handspring, judges will evaluate aspects of form and motion such as:
 Looking at the hands throughout the entire handspring.
 Land on the balls of the feet in a tight arch.

Variations 

A front handspring can be started from a stationary standing position, but it is more common for gymnasts to hurdle into front handsprings at a run. It is also possible to precede a front handspring with a "step out", which is similar to a handspring but lands one foot at a time. It can be performed on beam the same way it is performed on floor. It is the most basic type of vault performed at competitions.

A variation of the back handspring often performed on the balance beam is called the "back handspring step-out". In this variation, the gymnast splits the legs upon takeoff, attains a full split when inverted, and lands one foot at a time. Stepping out makes it easier for the gymnast to land safely and perform other tricks following the handspring. A back handspring can also be performed on the vault as part of a vault called a Yurchenko.

In another variation of a front handspring, called a flyspring, the gymnast's feet are held together from beginning to end. Therefore, in order to do a flyspring, the gymnast must jump into it.

Flips such as a salto or layout may be performed after a handspring; these may twist as well as flip. Similarly, a handspring may be preceded by another rotational move, such as a cartwheel landing with the feet together.

See also 

 Roundoff
 Somersault

References

External links 
Steps of Back Handspring

Gymnastics elements
Acro dance moves